The Royal Collection Project is a body of seventy five contemporary Canadian watercolours housed within The Royal Collection of Queen Elizabeth II.

They comprise the single largest Canadian component within The Royal Collection, and were compiled in two phases by the Canadian Society of Painters in Water Colour (CSPWC/SCPA) to mark the Societyʼs sixtieth and seventy-fifth anniversaries which were celebrated in 1985 and 2000, respectively.

Along with most of the Royal Collectionʼs works on paper they reside in the Royal Library at Windsor Castle and are under the administrative care of the Royal Librarian.

History 
The initial sixty piece collection was formed in 1985 as part of the Diamond Anniversary celebrations of the CSPWC. Each watercolour in the collection was created by a different elected member of the Society. The paintings were unveiled 5 December 1985 in an exhibition at the MacDonald Gallery (now the John B. Aird Gallery) in the Ontario Legislative Building(s) They were later shown at Ontario House, King Charles Place, London, U.K. (13 March - 24 April 1986) where an official reception and handover to the Royal Collection took place on 12 March 1986. A second display of the collection at Ontario House took place in 1988.

The paintings are housed in the Print Room of the Royal Library. They form part of the Royal Collection of Drawings and Watercolours. A selection was on public display in the castle throughout 1986 and 1987. Since their 1986 arrival at Windsor Castle, the paintings have been referred to as "The Canadian Gift".

In 2000 as part of the CSPWCʼs seventy-fifth anniversary celebrations a competition was held among newly elected members not represented in the original sixty piece collection to select fifteen additional works to add to the Windsor Castle holdings. This brought the group up to the symbolic total of seventy-five.

The selected works were then exhibited at Toronto's O'Connor Gallery and later at The Arts and Letters Club of Toronto, site of the 1925 founding of the Society.

The Prince of Wales, an Honorary Member of the Society, accepted the works at a reception hosted by both the CSPWC and Jeremy Kinsman the High Commission(er) of Canada to the United Kingdom.

Initial concept and final execution 

As the 1985 diamond (sixtieth) anniversary of the Canadian Society of Painters in Water Colour approached, the Societyʼs executive decided to launch a series of commemorative events that would highlight the history and achievements of the
organization. One suggestion was that a collection of watercolours by Society members be compiled and placed with a major national cultural body. It was thought that a collection of sixty works selected by jury would be appropriate. This idea met with strong support and the proposal was presented to a number of institutions including Rideau Hall, The National Gallery of Canada, The Royal Ontario Museum, The Art Gallery of Ontario and several major university galleries.

The idea took on the name of the "Diamond Jubilee Collection" and it seemed to be a relatively straight forward project of identifying a host institution and then judging and collecting sixty works. Sensibly, as it turned out, the original concept had envisioned small paintings in case the Society was asked to submit them in albums, portfolios or presentation cases.

In 1985 Sir Robin Mackworth-Young, the Royal Librarian and author of a book on the history of the Royal Collections was contacted by the CSPWC when the Society learnt that there were few Canadian art works held in the Royal Collection. (Despite Canada being traditionally identified as the Senior Dominion within the Commonwealth several other countries such as India and Australia were far better represented.) The ensuing exchange of correspondence resulted in the CSPWC/SCPAʼs anniversary collection being accepted by the Royal Librarian, Oliver Everett, on behalf of Queen Elizabeth II with a formal hand-over of the actual work taking place at Ontario House, London, on 12 March 1986. This coincided with the first foreign exhibition of the paintings being hosted by the Government of Ontario.

A selection of the watercolours was later put on public display in Windsor Castle during 1986 and 1987 in Windsorʼs drawing gallery.

The CSPWC/SCPA was delighted with the outcome of the project as the Royal Collection has unrivaled conservation standards and an internationally acknowledged reputation for loaning works. The Canadian watercolours are accessible to scholars who apply to the Royal Library.

In 2000 as part of the CSPWC/SCPAʼs seventy-fifth anniversary a competition was held among elected members not represented in the original sixty piece collection to select fifteen additional paintings to add to the Windsor Castle holdings. This brought
the donated collection up to a symbolic seventy-five works.

The selected fifteen works were first unveiled by Hilary Weston, Lieutenant Governor of Ontario, at Torontoʼs historic Arts and Letters Club in November 2000. The watercolours were transported to the United Kingdom and exhibited by the Canadian Government at Canada House in Trafalgar Square throughout December 2001 with a formal presentation to The Prince of Wales taking place on 11 December. This event was hosted by the CSPWC/SCPA and the Canadian High Commissioner Jeremy Kinsman.

There will be a third and final competition and selection taking place in the months leading up to the Societyʼs centennial in 2025. At that point a body of twenty five watercolours by artists unrepresented in the previous collections will be selected, exhibited and donated to the Royal Collection.

The entire Royal Collection is, as of 2011, being photographed and each item given an individual inventory number. Within a few years scholars and researchers accessing the Royal Collection site will be able to access images and data by using the corresponding RCIN number.

Phase 1, the 1985 Collection 
A general call for entry went out to all elected members of the CSPWC early in 1984 and a selection took place in the summer of 1985. The artists and works selected were:

Phase 2, the 2000 Collection 
Following the procedures used in the initial selection process a call for entries went out to all eligible members early in the 2000 anniversary year. A significant number of entries were presented for the judging which took place in Trinity College Chapel, University of Toronto. The artists and works selected for the second phase were:

References

Royal Collection of the United Kingdom
Canadian art
Watercolor paintings